The Chrüzlistock is a mountain of the Glarus Alps, located north of Sedrun on the border between the Swiss canton of Graubünden and Uri.

It derives its name from the historic pass at its northeastern hillside, the Chrüzlipass.

The Chrüzlistock is, along with Piz Vatgira and Pizzo dell'Uomo, one of the main peaks traversed by the Gotthard Base Tunnel. The tunnel runs below the summit Chrüzlistock, or more precisely, just east of it.

References

External links
 Chrüzlistock on Hikr

Mountains of the Alps
Mountains of Switzerland
Mountains of Graubünden
Mountains of the canton of Uri
Graubünden–Uri border
Two-thousanders of Switzerland
Tujetsch